Nora Heysen  (11 January 1911 – 30 December 2003) was an Australian artist, the first woman to win the prestigious Archibald Prize in 1938 for portraiture and the first Australian woman appointed as an official war artist.

Early years
Heysen was born in Hahndorf, South Australia as the fourth child of landscape painter (later Sir) Hans Heysen and his wife Selma Heysen (née Bartels), and was raised at The Cedars in Hahndorf in the Adelaide Hills. She studied art from 1926 to 1930 at the School of Fine Arts in Adelaide under F. Millward Grey and sold paintings to the Art Gallery of New South Wales and the Art Gallery of South Australia in 1930. From 1930 to 1933, she continued to study two days a week at the School, and worked in her own studio the rest of the time. In 1931 she visited Sydney with her parents, and spent two weeks studying at the Julian Ashton Art School.

Early career
Heysen's first solo exhibition was held in Sydney in 1933. In 1934 she traveled to London with her family, remaining in Europe, after they returned home, until 1937 studying and painting. When she returned to Australia she returned briefly to Adelaide and then moved to Sydney.

Archibald Prize
In 1938, she entered two portraits in the Archibald Prize. Her portrait of Madame Elink Schuurman was awarded the prize and she became the first woman to win the Archibald. There was a controversy involving criticism of her win by painter Max Meldrum.

War artist

On October 12, 1943, she became the first woman to be appointed as an Australian war artist at the rank of captain. "I was commissioned to depict the women's war effort. There was that restriction on what I did. So I was lent around to all the services, the air force, the navy and the army, to depict the women working at everything they did during the war". During her service Heysen completed over 170 works of art and was discharged from service in 1946 in New Guinea.

Family life
Following her discharge from war service Heysen went to London and later returned to Sydney in 1948. While in New Guinea, she met Dr. Robert Black, whom she married in 1953. She continued to paint, exhibit and travel with her husband. Her marriage ended in 1972.

Heysen's works are currently being held in the collections of the National Gallery of Australia, the Australian War Memorial, the National Library of Australia, the National Portrait Gallery and several state galleries.

Reception
A 1939 article in The Australian Women's Weekly ran with the headline "Girl Painter Who Won Art Prize is also Good Cook" and lists three of Heysen's favourite recipes along with her strategies for achieving domestic duties and leaving time for painting.

A major retrospective exhibition of the work of daughter and father, Hans and Nora Heysen: Two Generations of Australian Art was curated by the National Gallery of Victoria March - July 2019. Reviewing it, Sydney Morning Herald critic John McDonald described Nora's career as a "fractured, stop-start affair", but that in a "popular rethinking of the Heysen's place in local art history ... Nora's star has risen while her father's has declined". McDonald nominated as Nora's signature work her "breathtaking still life, Eggs (1927)" from the Hinton collection in the New England Regional Art Museum, and described her Still Life of quinces (1933) from the same collection as "painted with the precision of an old master".

Awards
In 1993 she was awarded the Australia Council's Award for Achievement in the Arts and on 26 January 1998 she was appointed a Member of the Order of Australia for her service to art.
1933: Melrose Prize for Portraiture
1938: Archibald Prize for her portrait of Adine Michele Elink Schuurman
1993: Australia Council Award for Achievement in the Arts
1998: Order of Australia (AM)

Notes

References
Australian Art: Artist: Heysen, Nora Accessed: 2007-11-21
Australian War Memorial. Fifty Australians: Nora Heyson
National Library of Australia. 2001. Nora Heysen Exhibition
Williamson, Kate Art Interview: Nora Heysen (1911-2003) Accessed: 2007-11-21

Further reading

External links 

 Madame Elink Schuurman 1938 - Archibald Prize winning portrait
 Nora Heysen at the Art Gallery of New South Wales
 Motherhood 1941 – Ballarat Fine Art Gallery
 AAMWS (Private Gwynneth Patterson) 1944 – Australian War Memorial

1911 births
2003 deaths
World War II artists
Archibald Prize winners
Members of the Order of Australia
Australian people of German descent
Australian women painters
Australian portrait painters
People from Hahndorf, South Australia
Australian war artists
20th-century Australian painters
20th-century Australian women artists
Julian Ashton Art School alumni
21st-century Australian women
21st-century Australian people